Athipattu New Town [Acronym: ANT] (Tamil: அத்திப்பட்டு புது நகர் / அத்திப்பட்டு நியூ டவுன்) is a census town in Chennai, Thiruvallur district in the state of Tamil Nadu, India. It is a northern part of Chennai city. The neighbourhood is served by Athipattu Pudhunagar railway station of the Chennai Suburban Railway network. Special Industrial area of Tamil Nadu.
Surrounded by Kamarajar Port, North Chennai Thermal Power Station, NTECL, India Cement, Zuari Cement, L&T Shipbuild, IOCL, HPCL, BPCL & more Container yard terminals.

Surroundings

Neighbourhoods in Chennai